Paul McPhee is an American artist born and raised in Southern California, who lives in Martha’s Vineyard Island. He grew up with a love for the sea. He started his art career with painting marine life art and has expanded his talents by creating designs of many genres. This includes album covers, working with movie studios, fine art for worldwide events and tournaments, and non-profit and charitable organizations. With the help of Heather Faust he had many successful art shows. McPhee is partnered with Martha’s Vineyard Screenprinting Co. designing apparel and accessories.

McPhee teamed up with artist Jim Warren to make an album cover for the band Great White in 1999 for the album Can't Get There from Here which earned him a Grammy nomination. His marine life oil and watercolor paintings have been featured on magazine covers and a commemorative Florida Fishing & Game stamp. He also has licensed artwork with Universal Studios on his designs on the 30th anniversary of Jaws. McPhee has also appeared in the documentary The Shark Is Still Working. More recently, McPhee has worked on the major motion picture The Last Rites of Ransom Pride in the art department, creating various story boards used for the film.

References

Living people
American artists
People from California
Year of birth missing (living people)
Place of birth missing (living people)